Kätlin Vainola (born 30 September 1978 in Tallinn) is a contemporary Estonian children’s writer and poet. She sometimes uses the pen name Marie Myrk.

Biography
Born in Tallinn, she spent her earliest years in the subdistrict of Kopli before the family moved to Põlva. The family later returned to Tallinn where she graduated from secondary school at the Pääsküla Gymnasium.

Vainola graduated from Tallinn University in Estonian philology in 2002 and has worked as a teacher, project manager, and editor and has written lyrics for the bands Vennaskond and Sõpruse Puiestee. She currently works as the editor-in-chief of the children’s magazine Hea Laps. Since 2014 she is a member of the Estonian Writers' Union.

Personal 
Kätlin Vainola is married to musician Allan Vainola. They have two sons.

Bibliography 

 Ville, Tänapäev 2006
 Mia, Konrad ja avanevad uksed (Mia, Conrad, and the Opening Doors), Tänapäev 2008
 Kelli – peaaegu haldjas (Kelly – Almost a Fairy), Pegasus 2008
 Metsaelu aabits (The ABCs of Forest Life), Menu Kirjastus 2009
 Tiigielu aabits (The ABCs of Pond Life; with Aleksei Turovski), Menu Kirjastus 2011
 Suvevaheaeg koolis (Summer Break at School), Tallinna Keskraamatukogu 2011
 Karuelu aabits (The ABCs of Bear Life; with Peep Männil), Menu Kirjastus 2012
 Lift, Pegasus 2013
 Kus on armastus? (Where Is Love?), Päike ja Pilv 2014, 2017
 Kelli hakkab piraadiks (Kelly Becomes a Pirate), Pegasus 2014
 Sonja ja kass (Sonya and the Cat), Pegasus, 2015
 Poiss, kes joonistas kaarte (The Boy Who Drew Maps)
 Nähh Pariisis (Naa in Paris), Päike ja Pilv 2017
 Krips-kraps, eesti laps (Estonian Child – Mild and Wild), Eesti Instituut 2017
 Lood julgetest Eesti tüdrukutest (Stories of Brave Estonian Girls), Pegasus 2018
 Minu Eesti seiklus (My Estonian Adventure), Päike ja Pilv 2019

Awards 

 2005 Children’s Story Competition My First Book, 3rd place (Ville)
 2009 Good Children’s Book (Kelly – Almost a Fairy)
 2011 Good Children’s Book (The ABCs of Pond Life)
 2013 Good Children’s Book (Lift)
 2013 The Knee-High Book Competition, 1st place (Where is Love?)
 2014 The White Ravens (Lift)
 2014 Good Children’s Book (Where is Love?)

Translations 
German

 Lift, Willegoos 2015
 Wo ist die Liebe?, BaltArt 2015

Italian

 A che piano va? Sinnos 2016

Lithuanian

 Liftas, 700 eilučių 2016

References 

1978 births
Living people
Estonian children's writers
Estonian women children's writers
Estonian women poets
21st-century Estonian women writers
21st-century Estonian poets
Tallinn University alumni
Writers from Tallinn